Bill Wilson (born in 1944) is a hereditary chief, politician, and lawyer. He carries the Kwak’wala name Hemas Kla-Lee-Lee-Kla. Hemas means “the Chief who is always there to help” and Kla-Lee-Lee-Kla means “the first rank among the eagles.” He is a descendant of the Musgamgw Tsawataineuk and Laich-kwil-tach peoples, which are part of the Kwakwaka'wakw, also known as the Kwak’wala-speaking peoples.

Personal life 
Wilson was born in 1944 in Comox, British Columbia. Wilson is the son of Puugladee (also known as Ethel or Effery), the eldest child of a hereditary chief and a hamatsa, a position of very high stature in Kwagiulth culture. Wilson’s father, Charlie Wilson, was the eldest of six and supported his siblings while growing up. Both of Wilson’s parents have passed away. His father died at age 62 from diabetes complications.

Wilson is a descendant of the Musgamagw Tsawataineuk and Laich-kwil-tach peoples, which are part of the Kwakwakaʼwakw, also known as the Kwak’wala-speaking peoples. The Kwawkgewlth people are a warrior tribe. They traditionally live from northern Vancouver Island along the inside passage, the Broughton Archipelago and the mainland inlets, but are traditionally people of the sea.

Wilson was married to Sandra Wilson, a teacher. They later divorced. They have two daughters, Jody Wilson-Raybould, former Member of Cabinet in the Justin Trudeau government, and Kory Wilson, an Executive Director at British Columbia Institute of Technology. Wilson is currently married to his second wife, Bev Sellars, a Chief of the Xat’sull (Soda Creek) First Nations. Wilson has five grand-daughters.

Education 
Wilson studied at the University of Victoria where he was awarded his Bachelor of Arts degree in 1970. He then studied at the University of British Columbia (UBC) Faculty of Law where he received his law degree in 1973. In his year of admissions at UBC, he received the second highest Law School Admission Test score in British Columbia. He was the second Indigenous person to graduate from UBC’s law school. Wilson’s first cousin, Alfred Scow, was the first Indigenous person to graduate from UBC’s law school in 1961. Scow also went on to become the first Indigenous lawyer in British Columbia and the first Indigenous judge appointed to the BC Provincial Court where he presided from 1971 to 1992.  Scow also won numerous awards, including the UBC Great Trekker Award, a UBC Honorary Doctor of Laws Degree, the Order of BC, and the Order of Canada.

Political career 
Wilson served as director of the Union of British Columbia Indian Chiefs from 1970 to 1973. In his third year of law school, Wilson was the director of Aboriginal title and land claims for the BC Association of Non-Status Indians. This organization was later renamed the United Native Nation where Wilson presided as founding president from 1976-1981. From 1982-83, Wilson was the vice-president of the Native Council of Canada, known now as the Congress of Aboriginal Peoples, and was its spokesmen at the 1983 First Ministers Conference.

In March of 1983, Wilson, and other Indigenous leaders, met with Prime Minister Pierre Elliot Trudeau to successfully negotiate and draft the first and only amendment to Canada’s new Constitution in 1982. This amendment is Section 35 of the Constitution Act, 1982. Section 35 enshrined Indigenous title to traditional lands and treaty rights and established equality of Indigenous women. During these negotiations, on Canadian national television, Wilson famously informed Prime Minister Pierre Elliott Trudeau that Wilson's two daughters hoped to become lawyers and then Prime Minister.

In 1988, Wilson helped found the BC First Nations Congress, whose aim was to help coordinate land claims negotiations and settlements, and was elected its chairman. In 1990, the organization changed its name to the First Nations Summit and met with Prime Minister Brian Mulroney to discuss land claims issues. In 1992, Wilson, Mulroney and BC Premier Mike Harcourt signed an agreement that created the BC Treaty Commission.

Presently, Wilson is the coordinator of the Musgamagw Tribal Council of the Kwagiulth nation. He is a hamatsa, thus granted the name Hemas Kla-Lee-Lee-Kla, a recognition of his worthiness and his achievements that have led to his right to be a Hamatsa and a Chief of his tribe.

References

1944 births
Living people
20th-century First Nations people
21st-century First Nations people
Indigenous leaders in British Columbia
Kwakwaka'wakw people
People from Comox, British Columbia
Peter A. Allard School of Law alumni
University of Victoria alumni
First Nations Summit Task Group members